Harrison Township is a township in Lee County, Iowa.

History
Harrison Township was organized in 1841.

Notable People
Richard Proenneke (1916-2003) - naturalist, subject of books and documentary

References

Townships in Lee County, Iowa
Townships in Iowa